Qiu Xiaojun (裘晓君) (born June 30, 1990 in Hangzhou, China) is a Chinese professional boxer and the current WBC Silver Super Bantamweight Champion.

Professional career

Qiu made his professional debut in 2010, losing two of his first nine fights to fellow contender Johnathon Baat.

Qiu claimed his first professional title, the vacant WBC Asian Boxing Council Continental super bantamweight title against Jilo Merlin in his twelfth fight. He followed this up with a victory over Lizandro De los Santos to claim the interim WBC Youth World super bantamweight title. He would later avenge his two defeats to Baat in 2014, retaining his regional title after five defenses.

In early 2015 Qiu faced veteran Sylvester Lopez and won the vacant WBC Silver super bantamweight title via 6th round technical knockout, moving him up the World Boxing Council's rankings.

Professional record

|- style="margin:0.5em auto; font-size:95%;"
| style="text-align:center;" colspan="8"|21 Wins (10 Knockouts), 4 Defeats (1 Knockout), 0 Draw
|-  style="text-align:center; margin:0.5em auto; font-size:95%; background:#e3e3e3;"
|  style="border-style:none none solid solid; "|Res.
|  style="border-style:none none solid solid; "|Record
|  style="border-style:none none solid solid; "|Opponent
|  style="border-style:none none solid solid; "|Type
|  style="border-style:none none solid solid; "|Rd., Time
|  style="border-style:none none solid solid; "|Date
|  style="border-style:none none solid solid; "|Location
|  style="border-style:none none solid solid; "|Notes
|- align=center
|Loss
|21-4-0
|align=left| Nehomar Cermeño
|UD
|
|
|align=left|
|align=left|
|- align=center
|Win
|21-3-0
|align=left| Robert Udtohan
|TKO
|
|
|align=left|
|
|- align=center
|Loss
|20-3-0
|align=left| Nehomar Cermeño
|TKO
|
|
|align=left|
|align=left|
|- align=center
|Win
|20-2-0
|align=left| Raymond Commey
|UD
|
|
|align=left|
|align=left|
|- align=center
|Win
|19-2-0
|align=left| Amor Belahdj Ali
|TKO
|
|
|align=left|
|align=left|
|- align=center
|Win
|18-2-0
|align=left| Diarh Gabutan
|KO
|
|
|align=left|
|align=left|
|- align=center
|Win
|17-2-0
|align=left| Xu Congliang
|UD
|
|
|align=left|
|
|- align=center
|Win
|16-2-0
|align=left| Sylvester Lopez
|TKO
|
|
|align=left|
|align=left|
|- align=center
|Win
|15-2-0
|align=left| Ruslan Berchuk
|KO
|
|
|align=left|
|align=left|
|- align=center
|Win
|14-2-0
|align=left| Rasmanudin
|KO
|
|
|align=left|
|align=left|
|- align=center
|Win
|13-2-0
|align=left| Jonathan Baat
|UD
|
|
|align=left|
|align=left|
|- align=center
|Win
|12-2-0
|align=left| Jason Cooper
|UD
|
|
|align=left|
|align=left|
|- align=center
|Win
|11-2-0
|align=left| Lizandro De los Santos
|KO
|
|
|align=left|
|align=left|
|- align=center
|Win
|10-2-0
|align=left| Jilo Merlin
|UD
|
|
|align=left|
|align=left|
|- align=center
|Win
|9-2-0
|align=left| Jonel Alibio
|UD
|
|
|align=left|
|
|- align=center
|Loss
|8-2-0
|align=left| Jonathan Baat
|TD
|
|
|align=left|
|
|- align=center
|Win
|8-1-0
|align=left| Saichol Sithtichai
|TKO
|
|
|align=left|
|
|- align=center
|Win
|7-1-0
|align=left| Hwi-jong Kim
|TKO
|
|
|align=left|
|
|- align=center
|Loss
|6-1-0
|align=left| Jonathan Baat
|UD
|
|
|align=left|
|
|- align=center
|Win
|6-0-0
|align=left| Pharkin Phakdeepin
|TKO
|
|
|align=left|
|
|- align=center
|Win
|5-0-0
|align=left| Bayu Gede Prabow
|UD
|
|
|align=left|
|
|- align=center
|Win
|4-0-0
|align=left| Skak Max
|UD
|
|
|align=left|
|
|- align=center
|Win
|3-0-0
|align=left| Adeli Asa
|UD
|
|
|align=left|
|
|- align=center
|Win
|2-0-0
|align=left| Ericson Origenes
|UD
|
|
|align=left|
|
|- align=center
|Win
|1-0-0
|align=left| Lee Nam-joon
|UD
|
|
|align=left|
|align=left|

Television viewership

China

See also
WBC Silver Champions

References

External links

|-

|-

|-

Super-bantamweight boxers
1990 births
Living people
Sportspeople from Hangzhou
Chinese male boxers
21st-century Chinese people